Solnica  - personal name recorded in Polish–Lithuanian Commonwealth in 1616 in Lesser Poland and Greater Poland regions. It belongs to the group of surnames motivated by lexicons related to salt mining. In January 2020, about 600 persons bearing the surname  lived in Poland, mostly in Kielce, Warsaw, Siedlce, Krakow and Lodz.

Associated names:

Solnica (ger. Laakendorf)- Village in Pomeranian Voivodeship, founded in 1600 by the Olęder settlers.

Solnica - former street in Kielce, known for the fact that Stefan Zeromski lived next to it, now Silniczna street

Solnice - (ger. Solnitz) - Town in Hradec Králové, Czech Republic - former monastery and later medieval fortress.

Solnitsata - (bul. Солницата) - was an ancient town located in present-day Bulgaria and the site of a salt production facility.

Sollnitz - town in Dessau-Roßlau, in the state of Saxony-Anhalt, Germany.

Söllnitz - is a district of the city of Blankenhain in the Weimarer Land district, Thuringia.

Salnyzja - (rus.  Сальница, Salniza) - Village in Ukrainian  region of Vinnytsia.  Originally was granted Magdeburg city rights in 1607. After the Treaty of Sboriw concluded in 1652 it came back to Poland-Lithuania and was rebuilt. In 1722 the city was confirmed the privileges granted in 1607 by the Polish king.

Surname - notable people with the surname Solnica 
 Amy Solnica - Hadassah University Medical Centre and Hebrew University of Jerusalem researcher 
Andrzej Solnica – colonel of the Polish Army. He is best known as the commander of the 34th Armored Cavalry Brigade of  Great Hetman of the Crown Jan Zamoyski  
Anton Wilhelm Solnitz - German-Bohemian composer.
Antoni Solnica - fine wine merchant, father of Franciszek Solnicki - mayor of Kielce (1801-1809 under the Austrian rule)  
 Prof. Bogdan Solnica - professor of medicine at the Jagiellonian University  
 Dariusz Solnica - Polish footballer, he is best known as Legia Warsaw and Poland National teams u-15, u-16, u-23 striker 
Herschel Solnica - American Rabbi of New York City 
Prof. Hélène Solnica - French professor of literature 
Igor Solnica - Slovak marksman from Trnava, representative of ŠKP Trnava club, European champion from 2011 in combined shooting FITASC (Fédération Internationale de Tir aux Armes Sportives de Chasse) in Sarlóspuszta, Hungary
 Józef Solnica - decorated with a Virtuti Militari order, Cichociemny - Silent Unseen,  commander of the partisan unit and lieutenant of the Home Army
 Prof. Lilianna Solnica-Krezel - professor at Washington University Medical School in St. Louis 
 Marek Solnica - architect from city of Lodz,  member of the Association of Polish Architects of the Lodz branch 
Dr. Simon Solnica - American psychologist from New York City
Titi Solnica - Slovak wrestler from Nitra
Dr. Witold Solnica - Assistant professor at the Warsaw University of Technology

References 

Polish-language surnames